Bing is a German surname. Notable people with the surname include:

Abraham Bing (1752–1841), German rabbi
Andrew Bing (1574–1652), English scholar
Anine Bing, Danish model
Bernice Bing (1936–1998), Chinese-American artist
Brandon Bing (born 1989), American football cornerback
Darnell Bing (born 1984), American football player
Dave Bing (born 1943), American basketball player and mayor
Elisabeth Bing (1914–2015), German physical therapist
Geoffrey Bing (1909–1977), British politician
Herman Bing (1889–1947), German-American actor and voice actor
Ignaz Bing (1840–1918), German industrialist, naturalist, poet, and memoirist
Ilse Bing (1899–1998), German photographer
Inigo Bing (born 1944), British judge
Isaiah Beer Bing (1759–1805), French writer and translator
Jon Bing (1944–2014), Norwegian law professor
Jonathan Bing,  American attorney and politician
Kristian Magdalon Bing (1862–1935), Norwegian jurist, author and mountaineer
Lee Bing (died 2012), Hong Kong mezzo-soprano
Paul Robert Bing (1878–1956), Swiss-German neurologist
R. H. Bing (1914–1986), American mathematician
Richard Bing (1909–2010), American cardiologist
Rudolf Bing (1902–1997),  Austrian-born opera impresario
Siegfried Bing (1838–1905), German art dealer
Stanley Bing, pen name of Gil Schwartz (born 1951), American humorist and novelist
Steve Bing (1965–2020), American businessman
Suzanne Bing (1885–1967), French actress

Fictional characters
Chandler Bing, a character from Friends

See also
Bing (disambiguation)
Byng (disambiguation)

German-language surnames
Ashkenazi surnames